"The Sniffing Accountant" is the 68th episode of the sitcom Seinfeld, being the fourth episode of the series' fifth season. It aired on NBC on October 7, 1993.

In the episode, George's father gets him an interview as a brassiere salesman. Evidence points to Jerry's accountant being a cocaine user. Jerry, Kramer and Newman set up a sting to find out the truth. Elaine's new boyfriend is perfect except for his unwillingness to use exclamation points.

The episode was written by creators of Seinfeld, Larry David and Jerry Seinfeld, and directed by Tom Cherones. To research for one of this episode's recurring jokes where the characters feel others' shirt sleeves between their thumb and forefinger, David did this himself, assessing the different kinds of fabric and the owners' reactions. The episode received positive reviews from critics and received a 19.1/21 Nielsen rating.

Plot
In Monk's Café, Elaine discusses her new boyfriend, Jake Jarmel, whom she met when he approached her in her office and felt her jacket between his thumb and forefinger. Barry Prophet, Jerry's accountant, drops by. Jerry notes him sniffing during their conversation and concludes he could be on drugs, making him fearful for the security of his money.

Jerry tells Kramer about Barry, and Kramer shares his conviction that he is a drug addict. Jerry gives Kramer his sweater because it is too itchy. Kramer, Newman, and Jerry follow Barry to a bar. Kramer, wearing Jerry's sweater, tries to bait him into asking about drugs without success, but again notices him sniffing.

Elaine notices Jake did not put an exclamation point after an important phone message. Jake tries to dismiss the issue as trivial but Elaine gets increasingly outraged, leading them to break up. She subsequently edits Jake's book manuscript to replace many of the periods with exclamation points, prompting an uncomfortable meeting with her boss, Mr. Lippman, in which he derisively reads aloud some of her bizarre placings of exclamation points.

George's father gets him an interview with Sid Farkus for a job as a bra salesman. In his interview, George tells a sentimentalized version of the first time he saw a bra, resulting in him getting hired. Inspired by Elaine's story of how she met Jake, he feels a woman's shirt between his thumb and forefinger on his way out. The woman, who turns out to be Farkus's boss, is enraged by the act and demands that George leave the company. Farkus obediently fires George.

Jerry writes a letter dismissing Barry as his accountant and gives it to Newman for mailing. A pizza delivery man arrives and starts sniffing. He explains that he is allergic to mohair, which Kramer's sweater is made of, and Jerry and Kramer conclude it was the sweater that caused Barry to sniff. Jerry rushes out to stop Newman from mailing the letter. On his way to mail the letter, Newman's flirtations with a woman go awry when he feels her coat between his thumb and forefinger. The woman is enraged. Newman runs away in a panic, dropping the letter. Days later, Jerry announces that Barry filed for bankruptcy, seemingly having spent everything on drugs, and if he had terminated his relationship with him prior to the filing, he could have gotten his money back. Just when Jerry is about to confront Newman about his failed delivery, a woman takes notice of his coat and feels it with her thumb and forefinger, much to Jerry's delight.

Production
This episode was written by series co-creators Larry David and Jerry Seinfeld and directed by Tom Cherones. The cast first read the script for this episode on September 8, 1993, at 11:00 a.m. Filming took place on September 14, 1993, with eighteen members of the Vandelay Industries Mailing Listing (a Seinfeld fan club) among the audience.

In real life, Seinfeld has claimed that his accountant stole money (about US$50,000) from him to buy illegal drugs, with his suspicions inspiring the main plotline for this episode.

David actually worked as a bra salesman during his years as a struggling comedian. That had been many years prior to this episode though, so he had to do research in order to write dialogue pertaining to the configuration of modern bras. The writer's assistants called bra companies to ask questions.

Kramer's display of simultaneous drinking and smoking in this episode was unscripted. On the first attempt, Michael Richards let out a loud belch (with smoke) that earned uproarious laughter from the studio audience, but was deemed too broad by the show's producers, and a second take was done. This scene helped Richards win an Emmy Award for his portrayal of the character. The first take was seen in Seinfeld'''s one-hour retrospective The Chronicle, which took place prior to the original airing of "The Finale." It was included in the 2005 Season Five DVD set's blooper reel. Julia Louis-Dreyfus said that she was "in awe" when seeing him pull that off.

The line "barring some unforeseen incident" was first uttered in this episode by the character Sid Farkus, and the line eventually became a catchphrase around the show. Julia Louis-Dreyfus commented that it was like a line from Foghorn Leghorn, and worked as a "precursor to chaos."

Series continuity
Elaine and Jake Jarmel get back together and break up again in the season finale, "The Opposite". In the season 6 episode "The Scofflaw", Elaine plans revenge on him.

Sid Farkus returns in "The Doorman", where he is considering doing business with Frank Costanza and Kramer after they create a male bra. The line "barring some unforeseen incident" is uttered once again in that episode by Farkus.

George is seen with a Glamour magazine, a callback to "The Contest".

Cultural references
This episode makes a number of cultural references. Jerry makes references to Leave it to Beaver'' in his stand-up comedy bit that opens the show. He jokes about how the government is like parents for adults; the IRS being Ward and June Cleaver, and adults being Wally and The Beaver. He also says that your accountant is like Eddie Haskell, showing you "all these neat tricks to get away with stuff." He then says when you're sent to prison for tax fraud you would hope not to meet Clarence "Lumpy" Rutherford and "Whitey" Whitney.

A reference to Abscam is made when Kramer, Jerry, and Newman consider organizing a sting. Jerry and Newman argue over whether Glide Floss or dental tape is the better floss in this episode as well. Glide Floss was actually a big trend in the Seinfeld production office during the early part of season five.

Reception
This episode gained a 19.1 Nielsen Rating and a 29 audience share, meaning that 19.1% of American households watched the episode, and 29% of all televisions in use at the time were tuned into it. It reran on March 24, 1994, and earned exactly the same numbers, which was a good sign that the show was becoming a hit.

References

External links

"The Sniffing Accountant" on Sony Pictures

Seinfeld (season 5) episodes
1993 American television episodes
Television episodes written by Larry David
Television episodes written by Jerry Seinfeld